Darkness Death Doom is the sixth album by Runemagick. It was released in 2003 on Aftermath Music.

Track listing
  "Intro - CDXLIV"   – 1:42  
  "Ancient Incantations"   – 7:37  
  "Eyes of Kali"   – 8:48  
  "The Venom"   – 9:00  
  "Darken Thy Flesh"   – 5:58  
  "Doomed"   – 5:52  
  "Eternal Dark"   – 5:12  
  "DDD"   – 2:11  
  "Winter"   – 7:07  
  "Outro - 444"   – 5:18

A limited edition contains a bonus CD, titled The Pentagram.

  "The Pentagram"   – 37:55  
  "Landscape of Souls"   – 2:28  
  "Moon of the Chaos Eclipse"   – 3:46  
  "Darkness Death Doom"   – 2:55  
  "The Secret Alliance"   – 3:30  
  "Piece of Magick"   – 2:01  
  "Preludium"   – 0:59  
  "...Of Darkness"   – 0:47  
  "Milbeg"   – 2:22

Credits
 Nicklas Rudolfsson – vocals, guitar
 Emma Karlsson – bass
 Daniel Moilanen – drums

Runemagick albums
2003 albums